Randall Woodfin (born May 29, 1981) is an American lawyer and politician who is the 34th and current mayor of Birmingham, Alabama, after winning the October 3, 2017, runoff against incumbent William A. Bell. He previously served as president of the Birmingham City School Board (2013–2015) and as a city attorney of Birmingham from 2009–2017.

Early life and education
Woodfin was born and raised in North Birmingham and Crestwood neighborhoods. He attended North Birmingham Elementary School, Putnam Middle School, and Shades Valley High School. He graduated from Morehouse College, where he majored in political science and was student government association president. Woodfin went on to earn a J.D. from the Cumberland School of Law at Samford University.

Career

Early career
Between college and law school, Woodfin worked for the Birmingham City Council, the Mayor's Office Division of Youth Services, and the Jefferson County Committee on Economic Opportunity. He ran unsuccessfully for the Birmingham Board of Education's District 3 seat in 2009, placing third in a four-person race.

In 2009, Woodfin became an assistant city attorney for Birmingham, a position he held until he was elected mayor in 2017.

In 2013, he ran for a seat on the school board again, this time successfully. He was appointed president of the board two months after being elected; he held that position until 2015 and remained on the board until 2017.

He is a board member of several community organizations, including the Alabama Campaign to Prevent Teen Pregnancy, Birmingham Botanical Gardens, and the Hispanic Interest Coalition of Alabama. He is a former board member of Birmingham Change Fund, American Red Cross, Birmingham Education Foundation, Birmingham Cultural Alliance, S.T.A.I.R., and past president of the Birmingham chapter of the Morehouse College Alumni Association. He is a graduate of Leadership Birmingham class of 2014, Leadership Alabama class of 2016, and was a featured speaker at TEDx Birmingham 2017.

Woodfin was the Alabama state director for Hillary Clinton's 2016 presidential campaign.

2017 mayoral campaign
Woodfin announced his run for Birmingham mayor in August 2016, challenging incumbent candidate William Bell along with 10 other candidates. In the general election, held on August 22, 2017, Woodfin won 40% of the vote, triggering a runoff election with Bell, who placed second. Woodfin won the October 3 runoff with 58.95% of the vote, becoming the city's youngest mayor in over 120 years.

During the campaign, Woodfin criticized Bell's failure to improve Birmingham residents' quality of life and promised to focus his administration on revitalization of the city's 99 neighborhoods.

Bell criticized Woodfin for receiving out-of-state contributions during the campaign; Woodfin argued that it was the only way to combat the incumbent candidate's sizable local donor base.

Woodfin received support from Vermont Senator Bernie Sanders, who recorded a robo-call telling voters that Woodfin would fight for Medicare for All. Our Revolution President Nina Turner visited Birmingham twice to campaign for Woodfin.

As mayor

Woodfin promised throughout the campaign to conduct a forensic audit on city finances, but upon taking office instead conducted a performance audit.

In March 2018, Woodfin's transition committee announced it had discovered that the city's pension fund had been consistently underfunded for more than 15 years, endangering the city's credit rating and retirement benefits for thousands of city employees. Woodfin increased funding to the pension fund by $2.9 million in the city's 2019 budget, and by $5.2 million in the city's 2020 budget — which Woodfin's administration claimed fully met the city's obligation to the fund for the first time in more than a decade.

Woodfin's administration has drawn criticism for a perceived lack of transparency, with AL.com columnist Kyle Whitmire calling Woodfin's attempts to block public information requests "stalling and stonewalling" and a violation of his campaign promises to increase transparency.

Neighborhood revitalization
In his first two years in office, Woodfin budgeted $13 million for street resurfacing, $2.5 million toward clearing overgrown lots, and $6.5 million toward demolishing dilapidated structures. Woodfin has argued that his predecessor's policy regarding urban blight was "not as aggressive as it needed to be" and that it would be a "priority" for his administration.

Crime
Birmingham's high violent crime rate was a central plank of Woodfin's campaign platform; his nephew, Ralph Woodfin III, was shot and killed in August 2017, just weeks before the general election.

Shortly after Woodfin took office in November 2017, Birmingham Police Department Chief A.C. Roper announced his resignation. After a lengthy search, Woodfin appointed former Los Angeles Police Department commander Patrick D. Smith to the position.

In 2019, Woodfin's administration unveiled a public service announcement campaign titled "PEACE" featuring 30-second videos of mothers of gun violence victims telling their stories.

The city's homicide rate has stayed approximately the same since Woodfin took office; the city logged 117 homicides in 2017, 110 in 2018, and 112 in 2019. Woodfin has maintained that total violent crime has dropped in the city during his tenure, and points to the police department's removal of thousands of guns from the streets.

Several high-profile gun deaths — high-schooler Courtlin Arrington, 4-year-old Jurnee Coleman, Kamille "Cupcake" McKinney, and Sgt. Wytasha Carter — happened during Woodfin's first two years in office. Additionally, 2020 resulted in the highest murder rate in Birmingham, Alabama in 25 years.

In January 2022, Birmingham Police Chief Patrick Smith announced his resignation. Woodfin appointed Capt. Scott Thurmond as interim chief.

Food deserts
One of Woodfin's early campaign promises was to address food deserts in the city.

COVID-19 response
Along with the Birmingham City Council, Woodfin's administration passed a $15 million COVID-19 response plan in March 2020, allocating extra money for first responders' personal protective equipment, allocating overtime pay, and placing $1 million in a small business emergency loan fund. Woodfin also urged the council to pass a "shelter-in-place" ordinance on March 24, which has been extended through the end of April 2020. Under Woodfin, the Birmingham City Council voted to extend the city's mask mandates through May 24, 2021, after Governor Kay Ivey announced that the statewide mandate would end April 9.

Confederate monuments
For years, Birmingham residents had been requesting Birmingham take down the Confederate monument located in the park across the street from Birmingham City Hall. Due to years of inaction, and after the murder of George Floyd, residents took to the street to try and take down the monument themselves. The next morning Woodfin ordered the removal of the Confederate Soldiers and Sailors Monument in Linn Park to try and prevent another protest. He also filed an executive order banning the ability for residents to protest in any public park. Alabama Attorney General Steve Marshall filed suit against the city of Birmingham for violating the Alabama Memorial Preservation Act.

National politics
He endorsed Joe Biden in the 2020 Democratic presidential primary, despite having received Bernie Sanders' endorsement during his 2017 mayoral race. Woodfin cited Biden's ability to "make sure down-ballot candidates can win" as a primary reason for his endorsement.

Woodfin was selected as one of seventeen speakers to jointly deliver the keynote address at the 2020 Democratic National Convention.

Political views
Woodfin identifies as a political moderate, but has championed many progressive policies such as criminal justice reform, free college tuition, and marijuana legalization. In a 2019 interview with The Root, Woodfin argued that "being a moderate does not equal status quo... I support a lot of things on the left but—if I’m being real—I also believe you gotta win."

When running for mayor of Birmingham in 2017, Woodfin promised to "fight to make Birmingham a sanctuary city." However, in 2018 he reneged on that promise and instead proposed to make Birmingham a "welcoming city."

Woodfin believes in climate change and in 2018 he signed the "Alabama Mayors for 100% Sustainable Energy Pledge" pledge by the GASP (Greater-Birmingham Alliance to Stop Pollution) to fulfill a campaign promise. In spite of the promise and pledge, the Woodfin administration failed to live up to them.

Personal life
He grew up with three siblings; his older brother Ralph was killed by gun violence in 2011. Woodfin's nephew Ralph Woodfin III was killed in August 2017. He is single and is Christian. He attends Sixth Avenue Baptist Church in Birmingham. He is a fan of Mannie Fresh, Dr. Dre, The Neptunes, and Big K.R.I.T.

References

External links

1981 births
21st-century American politicians
African-American mayors in Alabama
Alabama Democrats
Cumberland School of Law alumni
Living people
Mayors of Birmingham, Alabama
Morehouse College alumni
African-American lawyers
Alabama lawyers
21st-century African-American politicians
20th-century African-American people